Tintwistle is a civil parish in the High Peak district of Derbyshire, England. The parish contains eleven listed buildings that are recorded in the National Heritage List for England.  All the listed buildings are designated at Grade II, the lowest of the three grades, which is applied to "buildings of national importance and special interest".  The parish contains the village of Tintwistle and the surrounding countryside.  The listed buildings include houses and cottages, churches, a chapel and a Sunday school, a former workhouse, a bridge, and a valve station.


Buildings

References

Citations

Sources

 

Lists of listed buildings in Derbyshire